Forest Hills is a mostly residential neighborhood in the central portion of the borough of Queens in New York City. It is adjacent to Corona to the north, Rego Park and Glendale to the west, Forest Park to the south, Kew Gardens to the southeast, and Flushing Meadows–Corona Park to the east.

The area was originally referred to as "Whitepot". The current name comes from the Cord Meyer Development Company, which bought  in central Queens in 1906 and renamed it after Forest Park. Further development came in the 1920s and 1930s with the widening of Queens Boulevard through the neighborhood, as well as the opening of the New York City Subway's Queens Boulevard Line. Forest Hills has a longstanding association with tennis: the Forest Hills Stadium hosted the U.S. Open until 1978 and the West Side Tennis Club offers grass courts for its members. The area's main commercial street, Austin Street, contains many restaurants and chain stores.

Forest Hills is located in Queens Community District 6 and its ZIP Code is 11375. It is patrolled by the New York City Police Department's 112th Precinct. Politically, Forest Hills is represented by the New York City Council's 29th District. It is located within New York's 6th congressional district.

History

Development
The development of adjacent Forest Park, a park on the southern end of Forest Hills, began in 1895. Starting in 1896, the landscape architecture firm of Olmsted, Olmsted & Eliot was contracted to provide a plan for the park.

In 1906, the Cord Meyer Development Company, headed by Brooklyn attorney Cord Meyer, bought abutting land made up of six farms (those of Ascan Bakus, Casper Joost-Springsteen, Horatio N. Squire, Abram V. S. Lott, Sarah V. Bolmer, and James Van Siclen). The company then renamed the aggregate  "Forest Hills", after Forest Park. Single-family homes, designed by architects such as Robert Tappan and William Patterson, were constructed on these 600 acres. The roads of Forest Hills were laid out by 1910. The present-day Ascan Avenue in Forest Hills is named after Ascan Bakus.

Margaret Sage, the founder of the Russell Sage Foundation, bought  of land from the Cord Meyer Development Company in 1908. This land was to be used for "Forest Hills Gardens", a development at the southern side of Forest Hills. Grosvenor Atterbury, a renowned architect, was given the commission to design Forest Hills Gardens. The neighborhood was planned on the model of the garden communities of England, with its own inn, garage, and post office. It also included narrow, winding roads to limit through traffic. As a result, there are many Tudor-style homes in Forest Hills. The more sprawling ones are located in Forest Hills Gardens, but most are located in the section loosely bounded by 68th Avenue on the north; 72nd Road on the south; 108th Street on the west; and Grand Central Parkway on the east. The construction of this area used a prefabricated building technique. Each house was built from approximately 170 standardized precast concrete panels, fabricated off-site and positioned by crane. The houses were mostly constructed between 1910 and 1917.

The Long Island Rail Road opened a station in Forest Hills in 1911, and the Queens Boulevard trolley line opened two years later. The LIRR station was built with a brick courtyard, a clock tower, and arch-filled underpasses, fitting in with the Forest Hills Gardens section of the neighborhood. Since the railroad and trolley both connected to Manhattan, the presence of these two transportation options spurred development in Forest Hills.

Growth
In 1914, the West Side Tennis Club moved from Manhattan to Forest Hills Gardens. They constructed the Forest Hills Tennis Stadium, a stadium with approximately 13,000 seats, in 1923. The U.S. Open and its predecessor national championships were held there until 1978, making Forest Hills synonymous with tennis for generations. Forest Hills also had a golfing presence for a short time. The Queens Valley Golf Club started constructing a golf course in the neighborhood in 1922 and it was open by 1924. However, the club was closed in 1938 so that developers could build housing atop the site of the course.

Queens Boulevard was widened in the 1920s. Planning for a Queens Boulevard subway line started around this time. There were proposals for two stations in Forest Hills: an express station serving all trains on 71st Avenue, and a local station at 75th Avenue. During the late 1920s, in anticipation of the arrival of the subway, land was bought by developers and was built up. Zoning laws were changed to allow fifteen-story apartment buildings to be built, and made the neighborhood of Forest Hills a more desirable place to live, especially as it was an express stop. Queens Borough President George Harvey predicted that the introduction of the subway to Forest Hills would turn Queens Boulevard into the "Park Avenue of Queens." Excavation for the line started in 1931, and the two subway stops in Forest Hills opened in 1936 along with six other stations on the Queens Boulevard line.

The population nearly doubled in the late 1920s, going from 9,500 residents in 1927 to 18,207 residents three years later. By 1940, after the subway opened, the population had increased to 32,500 residents. By this time, development had largely stopped due to World War II, and about 25 empty lots in Forest Hills Gardens were developed after the war. At the same time, the single-family houses in Forest Hills were being razed to create new apartment buildings. The land in Forest Hills Gardens was fully developed by the 1960s, but there would still be empty lots in Forest Hills itself until the mid-1990s.

Later history
In 1972, residents protested against Forest Hills Houses, a proposed public housing development with three 24-story buildings at 62nd Drive and 108th Street. It was part of Mayor John Lindsay "scatter-site" plan to construct public housing in neighborhoods that had none (as opposed to concentrating public housing in poor neighborhoods). White middle-class residents believed that the public housing would depreciate the community's quality of life because poor residents would move into the housing. Advocates for the project accused residents of racism, since the proposed development's residents would be mostly people of minority races. Lindsay garnered significant opposition due to the controversy surrounding Forest Hills Houses. Mario Cuomo, a lawyer and the future Governor of New York, was assigned to mediate the dispute and succeeded in halving the size of the project. The New York City Housing Authority ultimately implemented a rigorous screening process for prospective residents of Forest Hills Houses, with quotas for elderly and poorer tenants.

During the 1970s and 1980s, the neighborhood became more racially diverse. Discriminatory covenants for prospective Forest Hills Gardens residents were lifted, and immigrants from Iran, India, Israel, and the Soviet Union started residing in Forest Hills.

Demographics

Based on data from the 2010 United States Census, the population of Forest Hills was 86,364, an increase of 1,318 (1.5%) from the 85,046 counted in 2000.

The racial makeup of the neighborhood was 58.3% (48,822) White, 2.5% (2,086) African American, 0.1% (63) Native American, 24.2% (20,233) Asian, 0.0% (22) Pacific Islander, 0.4% (373) from other races, and 2.1% (1,719) from two or more races. Hispanic or Latino of any race were 12.4% (10,410) of the population.

The entirety of Community Board 6, which comprises Forest Hills and Rego Park, had 115,119 inhabitants as of NYC Health's 2018 Community Health Profile, with an average life expectancy of 85.4 years. This is higher than the median life expectancy of 81.2 for all New York City neighborhoods. Most inhabitants are middle-aged and elderly adults: 31% are between the ages of 25–44, 28% between 45–64, and 19% over 64. The ratio of young and college-aged residents was lower, at 16% and 5% respectively.

As of 2017, the median household income in Community Board 4 was $75,447. In 2018, an estimated 26% of Forest Hills and Rego Park residents lived in poverty, compared to 19% in all of Queens and 20% in all of New York City. One in seventeen residents (6%) was unemployed, compared to 8% in Queens and 9% in New York City. Rent burden, or the percentage of residents who have difficulty paying their rent, is 50% in Forest Hills and Rego Park, lower than the boroughwide and citywide rates of 53% and 51% respectively. Based on this calculation, Forest Hills and Rego Park is considered to be high-income relative to the rest of the city and not gentrifying.

Land use

The southern part of Forest Hills contains a particularly diverse mixture of upscale housing, ranging from single-family houses, attached townhouses, and both low-rise and high-rise apartment buildings. South of the Long Island Rail Road, the Forest Hills Gardens area is a private community that features some of the most expensive residential properties in Queens County. Until the 1970s, it was subject to restrictive covenants which, while containing no explicit economic, social or racial restrictions, effectively excluded "working-class people", as noted by Eric P. Nash in his 2002 New York Times book review of A Modern Arcadia. Forest Hills Gardens was named "Best Community" in 2007 by Cottage Living magazine. The adjacent Van Court community also contains a number of detached single-family homes.  There are also attached townhouses near the Westside Tennis Center and detached frame houses near Metropolitan Avenue.

The north side of Forest Hills is home to the Cord Meyer community, which contains detached single-family homes. Teardowns and their replacement with larger single family residences has had a significant impact on the architectural integrity of the area. However, the Bukharian Jewish community, whose members have settled in the area in large numbers since the late 1990s, advocating the changes say the bigger homes are needed for their large extended families.

On the northwestern edge of Forest Hills, on 62nd Drive and 108th Street immediately adjacent to the Long Island Expressway, is the Forest Hills Co-op Houses, a New York City Housing Authority low-income housing project. Its construction provoked controversy among the residents in the more prestigious areas of Forest Hills when it was constructed in the early 1970s.

The southeastern portion of Forest Hills contains Forest Hills South, a complex of 7 Georgian apartment buildings centered around a private English garden, which was formerly a mapped portion of 113th Street prior to the complex's construction in 1939. This enclave was designed by Philip Birnbaum.

Philip Birnbaum and Alfred Kaskel also designed and constructed numerous apartment buildings scattered throughout Forest Hills. These include the Grover Cleveland, the Van Buren Apartments, the Thomas Jefferson, the Maplewood, the Richard Apartments, the Stephen Apartments, the James Madison, the Cedar Apartments, the Howard Apartments, the James Monroe, the Nathan Hale, the St. Regis, the Roanoke, and the Kennedy House. Birnbaum and Kaskel's buildings largely remain standing, and are distinguished by their spacious lobbies, interior courtyards with fountains, curved brick corner terraces, and sunlit exposures. Other notable high-rise apartment buildings include the Continental (on 108th Street), the Pinnacle, Parker Towers, the Windsor and a 17-story luxury condo building completed in 2014, the Aston.

Points of interest
Forest Hills was once the home of the U.S. Open tennis tournament. When the Open was played at the tennis stadium, the tournament was commonly referred to merely as Forest Hills, just as All-England Lawn Tennis Association Championships are referred to simply as Wimbledon. In the 2001 movie The Royal Tenenbaums, Luke Wilson's character plays a tennis match at the West Side Tennis Club in Forest Hills. A pivotal scene in Alfred Hitchcock's 1951 film Strangers on a Train, in which the main character (played by Farley Granger) is a professional tennis player, features a lengthy championship game at the club, with distinctive shots of the surrounding community. The tennis stadium, which hosted numerous music concerts including The Beatles after the U.S. Open departed for Flushing Meadows, resumed hosting music concerts during the summer of 2013 when the British rock band Mumford & Sons played there to an overflowing crowd. Stadium officials have said they will now host as many as six music or cultural events at the stadium each season.

Austin Street is a busy, modern street with shops, cafes, restaurants, and other stores that acts as the center of Forest Hills. It has become a place people visit from other neighborhoods because of its charm.

Two monuments are erected in Forest Hills Gardens: One is a tribute to the victims of World War I, and the other is the mast of the Columbia, the winner of the America's Cup yacht races in both 1899 and 1901.

The Church-in-the-Gardens, St. Luke's Episcopal Church, and United States Post Office are listed on the National Register of Historic Places.

Police and crime
Forest Hills and Rego Park are patrolled by the 112th Precinct of the NYPD, located at 68-40 Austin Street. The 112th Precinct ranked 6th safest out of 69 patrol areas for per-capita crime in 2010. The area's low crime rate is attributed to its seclusion and reputation as a "suburb within the city". , with a non-fatal assault rate of 14 per 100,000 people, Forest Hills and Rego Park's rate of violent crimes per capita is less than that of the city as a whole. The incarceration rate of 102 per 100,000 people is lower than that of the city as a whole.

The 112th Precinct has a lower crime rate than in the 1990s, with crimes across all categories having decreased by 91.5% between 1990 and 2018. The precinct reported 0 murders, 18 rapes, 41 robberies, 53 felony assaults, 69 burglaries, 403 grand larcenies, and 37 grand larcenies auto in 2018.

Fire safety 
Forest Hills contains a New York City Fire Department (FDNY) fire station, Engine Co. 305/Ladder Co. 151, at 111-02 Queens Boulevard.

Health
, preterm births and births to teenage mothers are less common in Forest Hills and Rego Park than in other places citywide. In Forest Hills and Rego Park, there were 66 preterm births per 1,000 live births (compared to 87 per 1,000 citywide), and 4.6 births to teenage mothers per 1,000 live births (compared to 19.3 per 1,000 citywide). Forest Hills and Rego Park have a low population of residents who are uninsured. In 2018, this population of uninsured residents was estimated to be 11%, slightly lower than the citywide rate of 12%.

Ten percent of Forest Hills and Rego Park residents are smokers, which is lower than the city average of 14% of residents being smokers. In Forest Hills and Rego Park, 19% of residents are obese, 7% are diabetic, and 20% have high blood pressure—compared to the citywide averages of 20%, 14%, and 24% respectively. In addition, 11% of children are obese, compared to the citywide average of 20%.

Ninety-three percent of residents eat some fruits and vegetables every day, which is higher than the city's average of 87%. In 2018, 82% of residents described their health as "good", "very good", or "excellent", higher than the city's average of 78%. For every supermarket in Forest Hills and Rego Park, there are 5 bodegas.

Long Island Jewish Forest Hills is located in Forest Hills.

Post office and ZIP Code
Forest Hills is covered by ZIP Code 11375. The United States Post Office operates the Forest Hills Station at 106-28 Queens Boulevard and the Parkside Station at 10119 Metropolitan Avenue.

Education
Forest Hills and Rego Park generally have a higher percentage of college-educated residents than the rest of the city . The majority of residents (62%) have a college education or higher, while 8% have less than a high school education and 30% are high school graduates or have some college education. By contrast, 39% of Queens residents and 43% of city residents have a college education or higher. The percentage of Forest Hills and Rego Park students excelling in math rose from 42% in 2000 to 61% in 2011, and reading achievement rose from 48% to 49% during the same time period.

Forest Hills and Rego Park's rate of elementary school student absenteeism is less than the rest of New York City. In Forest Hills and Rego Park, 10% of elementary school students missed twenty or more days per school year, lower than the citywide average of 20%. Additionally, 91% of high school students in Forest Hills and Rego Park graduate on time, more than the citywide average of 75%.

K–12 schools

Public schools
Forest Hills contains the following public elementary schools which serve grades PK–5 unless otherwise indicated:
 PS 101 School In The Gardens
 PS 144 Col. Jeromus Remsen School
 PS 174 William Sidney Mount
 PS 175 Lynn Gross Discovery School
 PS 196 Grand Central Parkway
 PS 220 Edward Mandel
 PS 303 The Academy for Excellence through the Arts (grades PK–4)

The following public middle schools serve Forest Hills:
 JHS 157 Stephen A. Halsey (grades 6–9)
 MS 167 Metropolitan Expeditionary Learning School (grades 6–12)
 JHS 190 Russell Sage (grades 6–8)

There are no zoned high schools in New York City. The following high schools in Forest Hills serve grades 9–12:
 Forest Hills High School
 Queens Metropolitan High School

Private schools
Private schools in Forest Hills include two Catholic schools (Our Lady of Mercy and Our Lady Queen of Martyrs) and The Kew-Forest School, an independent school. Also located in Forest Hills is Yeshiva Gedolah Lubavitch, an ultra orthodox Chabad high school and branch of Tomchei Temimim.

Colleges
Bramson ORT College was an undergraduate college operated by the American branch of the Jewish charity World ORT. Its main campus was in Forest Hills, with a satellite campus in Brooklyn. It closed in February 2017 after failing to meet standards set by the New York State Education Department Board of Regents and losing its accreditation. Touro College/NYSCAS has a branch location in Forest Hills. Plaza College, a small regionally-accredited college offering associates and bachelors degrees, is also located in Forest Hills.

Libraries
The Queens Public Library operates two branches in Forest Hills. The Forest Hills branch is located at 108-19 71st Avenue, while the North Forest Park branch is located at 98-27 Metropolitan Avenue.

Transportation

Public transportation
The following MTA Regional Bus Operations bus routes serve Forest Hills:
: to Elmhurst or Old Howard Beach or Hamilton Beach (via Woodhaven Boulevard) 
: to Elmhurst or Howard Beach (via Woodhaven Boulevard)
: to East Elmhurst (via 108th Street, Austin Street, and 69th Avenue)
: to Corona via Middle Village (via 62nd Drive (to Corona), 63rd Road (to Forest Hills), 63rd Drive, Penelope Avenue, Eliot Avenue)
: to Elmhurst or Arverne (via Woodhaven/Cross Bay Boulevard)
: to Woodside or Rockaway Park (via Woodhaven/Cross Bay Boulevard)
: to Jamaica, Queens or Williamsburg, Brooklyn (via Metropolitan Avenue)
: to South Jamaica, Queens or East Midtown, Manhattan (via Queens Boulevard)
: to Electchester (via 69th Road/Jewel Avenue)
: to Elmhurst or Queens Village (via Horace Harding Expressway)
: express to Midtown Manhattan (via 69th Road/Jewel Avenue, Sixth Avenue)
: express to Midtown Manhattan (via LeFrak City, Sixth Avenue)
: express to Lower Manhattan (via Queens Boulevard, LeFrak City, Water Street, Church Street)
: express to Midtown Manhattan (via Yellowstone Boulevard, Sixth Avenue)
: express to Midtown Manhattan (via Woodhaven Boulevard, Sixth Avenue)
: express to Midtown Manhattan (via Queens Boulevard, Sixth Avenue)
: express to Midtown Manhattan (via LeFrak City, Third Avenue)
: express to Midtown Manhattan (via Yellowstone Boulevard, Third Avenue)
: express to Midtown Manhattan (via 69th Road/Jewel Avenue, Third Avenue)
: express to Midtown Manhattan (via Woodhaven Boulevard, Madison Avenue)

The following New York City Subway stations serve Forest Hills:





The neighborhood also has two Long Island Rail Road commuter rail stations: the Forest Hills station and the Kew Gardens station.

Road

The main thoroughfare is Queens Boulevard.  The street's width and complexity have led to a large number of pedestrian deaths, earning it the moniker "Boulevard of Death". Metropolitan Avenue is known for its antique shops. The commercial heart of Forest Hills is a mile-long stretch of Austin Street between Yellowstone Boulevard and Ascan Avenue: the latter thoroughfare was named in 1909 by developer Frederick Backus for his own father, Ascan Backus, II.

Parks and recreation
Forest Hills is bordered by two of the largest parks in Queens managed by the New York City Department of Parks and Recreation: the  Flushing Meadows–Corona Park, which is the site of two World's Fairs (in 1939 and 1964) and the iconic Unisphere; as well as the  Forest Park. Within Forest Hills, parks and playgrounds include the Yellowstone Municipal Park – Katzman Playground (located on Yellowstone Boulevard, between 68th Avenue and 68th Road); the Annadale Playground (located on Yellowstone Boulevard, between 64th Road and 65th Avenue); the Willow Lake Playground (located off the Grand Central Parkway, between 71st and 72nd Avenues); the Ehrenreich-Austin Playground (located on Austin Street, between 76th Avenue and 76th Drive); and the Russell Sage Playground (located on 68th Avenue, between Booth and Austin Streets).

Access to Flushing Meadows-Corona Park is restricted due to the fact that the Grand Central Parkway bisects the neighborhood and the park proper. Pedestrian access exists over the Grand Central Parkway at the Horace Harding Expressway, 64th Avenue, Jewel Avenue, and 72nd Road. A former entrance at 78th Avenue, leading to Willow Lake and providing pedestrian access to Kew Gardens Hills has been shuttered since 2001.

In popular culture
 
Forest Hills was featured as the home setting for the comic book superhero Spider-Man, where under the alias Peter Parker he grew up at 20 Ingram Street. In the comics the home was depicted as a modest, two-story boarding house run by his Aunt May.

The Ramones originated in Forest Hills. The band was recognized with the designation in 2017 of Ramones Way at 67th Avenue and 110th Street, in front of Forest Hills High School.

Simon and Garfunkel both graduated from Forest Hills High School in 1958. The duo performed at Forest Hills Stadium in 1966, 1967, 1968, and two nights in 1970. Paul Simon returned once again to Forest Hills Stadium in 2016 during his Homeward Bound farewell tour.

Billy Eichner wrote the parody song "Forest Hills State of Mind" about the neighborhood.

Notable people

 Jacob Arabo (born 1965), jewelry and watch designer who founded Jacob & Co.
 Awkwafina (born 1988), rapper and actress
 Hank Azaria (born 1964), actor and voice artist
 David Baltimore (born 1938), Nobel Prize-winning virologist
 Walter Becker (1950-2017), half of the musical duo Steely Dan
 Andrew Bergman (born 1945), screenwriter (Blazing Saddles, The In-Laws), writer/director (The Freshman, Honeymoon In Vegas), novelist (Jack LeVine mystery series) and playwright (Social Security, Honeymoon In Vegas).
 Jimmy Breslin (1929-2017), journalist
 Joseph Bowler (born 1928), artist and illustrator
 Daniel Bukantz (1917–2008), Olympic fencer
 Michael A. Burstein (born 1970), science fiction writer
 Dale Carnegie (1888–1955), self-improvement lecturer and author of How to Win Friends and Influence People lived at 27 Wendover Rd in Forest Hills.
 David Caruso (born 1956), actor in CSI: Miami, and NYPD Blue
 Candy Darling (1944–1974), Warhol superstar who appeared in a number of his films
 John R. Dilworth (born 1963), animator and creator of Cartoon Network's Courage the Cowardly Dog
 Sergei Dovlatov (1941–1990), Russian short–story writer and novelist; in 2014, the corner of 63rd Drive and 108th Street was given an honorary designation in his name.
 Walter Egan (born 1948), singer-songwriter ("Magnet and Steel")
 Billy Eichner (born 1978), comedian, actor, and host of Billy on the Street
 Geraldine Ferraro (1935–2011), member of U.S. House of Representatives, television personality
 Art Garfunkel (born 1941), singer-songwriter
 Ernie Grunfeld (born 1955), former player and general manager of the Washington Wizards
 Alan Hevesi (born 1940), disgraced former Comptroller of New York
 Steve Hofstetter (born 1979), comedian/radio personality
 John V. Hogan (1890–1960), radio pioneer
 John Francis Hylan (1848–1936), Mayor of New York City (1918–1925)
 Ethel D. Jacobs (1910–2001), thoroughbred horse owner and breeder, wife of Hirsch Jacobs
 Hirsch Jacobs (1904–1970), thoroughbred jockey, husband of Ethel D. Jacobs
 Donna Karan (born 1948), fashion designer
 Helen Keller (1880–1968), lecturer, author, fundraiser, activist
 Alan King (1927–2004), actor/comedian
 Andrea King (1919–2003), actress
 David Krumholtz (born 1978), actor
 Gary Kurfirst (1947–2009), concert promoter and record producer
 Michael Landon (1936–1991), actor known for his roles on Bonanza and Little House on the Prairie
 Harvey J. Levin (1924–1992), internationally recognized pioneer of communications economics, holder of Long Island's first professorial chair
 Jack Lew (born 1955), United States Secretary of the Treasury from 2013 to 2017
 Trygve Lie (1896–1968), first Secretary-General of the United Nations, serving from 1946 to 1952
 Carol Lynley (1942–2019), actress best known for her role in The Poseidon Adventure
 Jack McAuliffe (1866–1937), world lightweight boxing champion
 Chieli Minucci (born 1958), jazz musician
 Min Xiao-Fen (born 1961), pipa player and vocalist
 Michele "Big Mike" Miranda (1896–1973), consigliere of the Genovese crime family and one of the most powerful New York gangsters in the 1950s and 1960s
 Lore Noto (1923–2002), Off-Broadway producer
 Carroll O'Connor (1924–2001), actor, best known for his role as Archie Bunker on All in the Family
 Marco Oppedisano (born 1971), composer and guitarist
 Rick Overton (born 1954), actor and comedian
 Susan Polgar (born 1969), chess grandmaster
 The Ramones, seminal punk rock band:
 Dee Dee Ramone (1951–2002), bassist and songwriter of the Ramones
 Joey Ramone (1951–2001), lead singer and songwriter of the Ramones
 Johnny Ramone (1948–2004), guitarist of the Ramones
 Tommy Ramone (1952–2014), drummer and record producer of the Ramones
 Wilhelm Reich (1897–1957), psychiatrist known for his theories of Orgone energy
 Renée Richards (formerly Richard Raskind; born 1934), tennis player
 Branch Rickey (1881–1965), Major League Baseball executive
 Thelma Ritter (1902–1969), actress
 Ray Romano (born 1957), actor-comedian, best known for Everybody Loves Raymond
 Dave Rubinstein (1964–1993), punk rock musician
 Chris Rush (1946–2018), stand-up comedian
 Renato Russo (1960–1996), Brazilian bandleader
 Joan Shawlee (née Fulton; 1926–1987), actress
 Michael Simanowitz (1971–2017), member of the New York State Assembly.
 Todd Strauss-Schulson (born 1980), film director, screenwriter, producer, editor, and cinematographer
 Paul Simon (born 1941), singer-songwriter
 Fred Stone (1873–1959), actor
 Tatiana Troyanos (1938–1993), mezzo-soprano known for her work at the Metropolitan Opera
 Bob Tufts (1955-2019), Major League Baseball pitcher
 Jeff Wayne (born 1943), musician known for his musical version of The War of the Worlds
 Katharine Weber (born 1955), novelist, author of five novels, including Triangle and True Confections.
 Leslie West (1945–2020), of the hard rock band Mountain
 Anthony Weiner (born 1964), politician
 Adolph Alexander Weinman (1870–1952), sculptor
 Henry Willson (1911–1978), Hollywood agent
 Jack Wyatt (1917–2008), host of ABC's Confession; Episcopalian priest
 Gideon Yago (born 1978), journalist, former correspondent at MTV and CBS News
 Manuel Ycaza (1938–2018), jockey inducted into the National Museum of Racing and Hall of Fame
 Pia Zadora (born 1953), actress

Notes

References

External links

 Forest Hills Neighborhood Profile, About.com

 
Central Asian American culture in New York (state)
Jewish communities in the United States
Jews and Judaism in Queens, New York
Neighborhoods in Queens, New York
Russian communities in the United States
Russian-American culture in New York City
Russian-Jewish culture in New York City
Uzbekistani-American culture
Russell Sage Foundation